Ryan Daniel Buell (born July 8, 1982) is an American paranormal investigator, author and producer who was the main host of the TV show Paranormal State.

Early life
Buell was born July 8, 1982 in Corry, Pennsylvania, and raised in Sumter, South Carolina. He is of Italian and Native American ancestry. He earned bachelor degrees in journalism and anthropology from Penn State University in State College, Pennsylvania.

Career
Buell was the main host of the TV A&E show Paranormal State. He was the executive producer for the feature film American Ghost Hunter, released in 2010. In 2011, Buell and partner Chad Calek announced a 41-city tour for the film. In 2010, Buell served as Co-Executive Producer for Paranormal State and for The Ghost Prophecies, of which he is also the co-creator. Buell and his team decided against continuing Paranormal State after the fifth season to pursue other things. Their final episode aired Monday, May 2, 2011.

Personal life
Buell's memoir, Paranormal State: My Journey into the Unknown, was released in September 2010. Among other subjects, Buell discusses his bisexuality and his struggle to reconcile his sexual orientation with Catholicism, the faith with which he was raised. "I've decided to share my sexuality and struggle over faith in hopes that others will no longer feel as though they are alone or that they can't be religious."

Controversies
In July 2012, Buell claimed he had been diagnosed with pancreatic cancer. In late 2013, Buell told People magazine that he was near remission. However, his mother, Shelly Bonavita Lundburg, later denied his cancer diagnosis.

In July 2014, Buell began selling tickets for a "Conversations with the Dead Tour." These shows, however, were indefinitely postponed, and many of the customers did not receive refunds or further correspondence on the status of the shows. Buell's friend and collaborator on Paranormal State, Chip Coffey, claimed that the ticket sales had exceeded $80,000, and that while he had been in charge of helping plan the shows, he learned that Buell had not actually booked any of them.

Buell was arrested on September 18, 2016 in Florence County, South Carolina on a warrant from State College, Pennsylvania. He was extradited back to Pennsylvania and charged with two third-degree felonies for theft of leased property and receiving stolen property, and one misdemeanor for theft of services. He was released on bail from Centre County Corrections Facility on October 18 after spending 30 days in jail.
He was due back in court on November 2 for a pretrial hearing. Buell told the judge that if he was granted bail, he would stay with friends or his father in State College. He also reportedly relinquished his passport on October 19 and waived his right to a jury trial in January 2017.

Buell was subsequently arrested on April 21, 2017 on charges of simple assault and harassment of his boyfriend. In July 2017, after his releases from jail and rehabilitation, Buell published a personal blog post in which he admitted he was a recovering drug addict and had recently been discharged from rehabilitation. His civil and criminal cases remain unresolved.

References

General References

External links

 
 Interview with Ryan Buell

1982 births
Living people
People from Corry, Pennsylvania
American bloggers
Television producers from Pennsylvania
Bisexual men
Paranormal investigators
Donald P. Bellisario College of Communications alumni
People from Sumter, South Carolina
American people of Italian descent
American people who self-identify as being of Native American descent
American LGBT entertainers
LGBT people from Pennsylvania
Catholics from Pennsylvania
Catholics from South Carolina
Pennsylvania State University alumni
Prisoners and detainees of Pennsylvania
American bisexual writers